Prospect Hill is a summit located in Central New York Region of New York located in the Town of Augusta in Oneida County, west of Lloyds Corners.

References

Mountains of Oneida County, New York
Mountains of New York (state)